Christ Church is a historic Episcopal church located at Saluda, Middlesex County, Virginia.  It was constructed in 1712–1714, and is a one-story, rectangular brick building with a gable roof.  It measures 60 feet by 33 feet, 6 inches. The church was restored in 1843, and a gable-roofed vestibule added.
Burials in the churchyard include Congressman Andrew Jackson Montague and Chesty Puller.

The church was listed on the National Register of Historic Places in 1972.

References

External links

Christ Church, State Route 638, Urbanna, Middlesex County, VA: 1 photo at Historic American Buildings Survey

Historic American Buildings Survey in Virginia
Churches on the National Register of Historic Places in Virginia
Episcopal churches in Virginia
Churches completed in 1714
Buildings and structures in Middlesex County, Virginia
National Register of Historic Places in Middlesex County, Virginia
18th-century Episcopal church buildings
1714 establishments in Virginia